Diana Ross & the Supremes Sing and Perform "Funny Girl" is the thirteenth studio album released by Diana Ross & the Supremes on the Motown label, released in 1968. Berry Gordy had Diana Ross & the Supremes cover the songs from Barbra Streisand's Broadway musical Funny Girl original cast LP to tie-in with the September release of the feature-film version of the musical, also starring Streisand. The LP was not a success, and, with a Billboard 200 peak of 150, ranks as the lowest-charting of the Diana Ross-led Supremes albums.

It was, however, praised by the composer, Jules Styne as one of the finest renditions of his score after the Broadway cast and movie soundtrack albums . Despite the commercial failure, fans celebrated the release, and the group performed a medley on the Ed Sullivan Show .

Diana continued to perform "Don't Rain on My Parade" and "My Man" (equally associated with Fanny Brice), at her solo concerts throughout the 1970s.

On April 29, 2014, the album was released for downloading and streaming. Besides the original ten songs, every album track has also been remixed for this collection to only include the voices of Diana Ross, Mary Wilson and Cindy Birdsong instead of the chorus on the original album. Additionally there a live versions of "I´m the Greatest Star" (an outtake from "T.C.B.") and "My Man (Mon Homme)" (live from Las Vegas).

In July, 2020, it was announced that Real Gone Music would release "Funny Girl: The Ultimate Edition" in physical format on September 25, 2020.

Track listing
All tracks written by Jule Styne and Bob Merrill. All tracks produced by Berry Gordy and Gil Askey.

Side One
"Funny Girl"
"If a Girl Isn't Pretty"
"I Am Woman"
"The Music That Makes Me Dance"
"Don't Rain on My Parade"

Side Two
"People"
"Cornet Man"
"His Love Makes Me Beautiful"
"Sadie, Sadie"
"I'm the Greatest Star"

Personnel
Diana Ross – lead vocals
Mary Wilson – background vocals
Cindy Birdsong – background vocals
The Andantes – background vocals
Various LA session singers – background vocals
Gil Askey – arranger

Charts

References

External links
 Diana Ross & The Supremes sing "If A Girl Isn't Pretty"
 Diana Ross & The Supremes sing "The Music That Makes Me Dance"

1968 albums
Covers albums
The Supremes albums
Motown albums
Albums produced by Berry Gordy